Your Scream Is Music is the sixth studio album recorded by Sexepil. The album was recorded by Dávid Schram at Pannonia Studio in Budapest, Hungary and by Tibor Vangel at Mom!TheMeatloaf! Studios in Cardiff and mastered by Gavin Lurssen in Los Angeles, The United States.

Track listing

Personnel

Sexepil
 László Viktor - bass
 Tibor Vangel - drums, vocals, guitars, bass, programming
 Tamás Kocsis - guitars
 Endre Deák - guitars

The following people contributed to Your Scream Is Music
 Gabor Kapusi - art design
 Dávid Schram - co-producing, recording and mixing
 Gavin Lurssen -  mastering

References

External links
 'Your Scream Is Music - full album'' at YouTube
 Rat King official video  at YouTube

1995 albums
Sexepil albums